Brian Skerry is an American photojournalist and film producer specializing in marine life and ocean environments. Since  he has been a contributing photographer for National Geographic magazine with more than 30 stories to his credit, including 6 covers. In  Skerry won a Primetime Emmy Award for his role as producer in the miniseries, Secrets of the Whales.

Early life and education

Skerry was born in Milford, Massachusetts in 1961, and grew up in Uxbridge. He has stated that he was drawn to the water from a very young age and was always fascinated by ocean documentaries, along with the movies Jaws and The Deep

Career

Skerry worked on a diving charter boat based on the coast of Rhode Island from 1982–1992, taking divers out to explore New England shipwrecks. His early photography focused on marine life and shipwrecks. His first published photograph was in 1984 in The Boston Globe newspaper, an image of a shipwreck in Boston Harbor. During the 1990s he published photos and wrote stories for a variety of scuba diving magazines. His first book was published in 1995, Complete Wreck Diving, with co-author Henry Keatts. In 1996 he was the first to photograph a living Oarfish, an animal that inspired sea serpent legends. In 2015 Skerry was named a Nikon Ambassador (United States).

National Geographic

In  Skerry received his first assignment for National Geographic. In a  article in The Maine Magazine, Skerry recalls Bill Curtsinger, one of the first underwater photographers, turning down a National Geographic magazine photo shoot of the  pirate shipwreck Whydah Gally, buried in the sand off Cape Cod. Curtsinger turned down the job due to a scheduling conflict but put in a good word for Skerry, who in turn, took the story assignment. Skerry had his photos published in the May 1999 edition of National Geographic.

Skerry has been credited with more than 30 stories for National Geographic, including six on the front cover of the magazine. The subjects of his stories have included species such as harp seals, squid, right whales, Leatherback sea turtles, bluefin tuna, dolphins and coral reefs. Other stories have featured locations such as the Southern Line Islands, Ireland, Marine reserves of New Zealand, the Phoenix Islands, Japan, the Mesoamerican Reef, and in his home state, the Gulf of Maine.

In  National Geographic published three consecutive stories photographed by Skerry about sharks. While on assignment for National Geographic on September 1, 2016, he photographed U.S. President Barack Obama snorkeling in the waters off Midway Atoll in the Pacific Ocean, which lies within the Papahānaumokuākea Marine National Monument. It was the first photograph ever taken of a President of the United States underwater.

Secrets of the Whales

Secrets of the Whales was a multi-platform project Skerry created for National Geographic in 2017 about the science of whale culture. He credits the work of Canadian whale biologist Shane Gero as his inspiration for this project. Skerry proposed the project to National Geographic magazine, National Geographic Television and National Geographic Books and each division approved their respective project.

The cover story in National Geographic magazine appeared in the May 2021 issue, written by Craig Welch and photographed by Skerry. A book was published in April 2021 by National Geographic Books with the same name, written and photographed by Skerry. The four part miniseries, executive produced by James Cameron and narrated by Sigourney Weaver, premiered April 22, 2021, on Disney+. Skerry produced and starred in the miniseries, as well as providing underwater cinematography.

The documentary series was nominated for three Primetime Emmy Awards by the Academy of Television Arts & Sciences. On September 19, 2021 the miniseries was a winner in the category Outstanding Documentary or Nonfiction Series which was awarded to Skerry and the producers of the show. The film was also nominated for two awards from the Online Film & Television Association for best narration and Best Cinematography in a Variety, Sketch, Nonfiction, or Reality Program. At the Jackson Wild 2021 Media Awards Secrets of the Whales was awarded Winner: Limited Series and at the 2021 Environmental Film Festival in the Nation's Capital, Skerry was awarded the Shared Earth Foundation Award for Advocacy.

Conservation

In 2012 Skerry partnered with the Conservation Law Foundation in Boston to create The New England Ocean Odyssey.

Skerry lectures on issues of visual storytelling and ocean conservation and exploration, having presented at venues including The United Nations General Assembly, The World Economic Forum in Davos, Switzerland, TED Talks, The National Press Club in Washington, DC, The Royal Geographical Society in London and the Sydney Opera House in Australia. He's been a guest on several television programs including  CBS This Morning, Nightline, Anderson Cooper Full Circle and is a frequent guest on radio shows and podcasts.

Skerry is a Founding Fellow of the International League of Conservation Photographers, and the Explorer-In-Residence at the New England Aquarium.

Awards and recognition

 11-time award winner of Wildlife Photographer of the Year from the Natural History Museum, London.
 5-time award winner of Pictures of the Year International from Missouri School of Journalism
 Peter Benchley Ocean Awards for Excellence in Media
 Photographer’s Photographer Award - National Geographic
 Rolex National Geographic explorer of the year - National Geographic
 NOGI Awards - Art - Academy of Underwater Arts & Sciences
 Doctor of Humane Letters, Honoris Causa - Worcester State University

Secrets of the Whales
Awards for the miniseries, Secrets of the Whales for which Skerry was a Producer.

 Winner - Academy of Television Arts & Sciences - Outstanding Documentary or Nonfiction Series
 Winner - Jackson Wild 2021 Media Awards Limited Series
 Winner - Environmental Film Festival in the Nation's Capital, Shared Earth Foundation Award for Advocacy

Exhibitions

 National Geographic Museum Ocean Soul (Traveling exhibit), Washington, D.C.
 Smithsonian National Museum of Natural History Portraits of the Planet: The photography of Brian Skerry, Washington, D.C.
 United Nations Office at Geneva Wild and Precious Exhibit - Geneva, Switzerland
 National Geographic Museum Sharks: On Assignment with Brian Skerry (Traveling exhibit)'',  Washington, D.C.
 Visa pour l'Image Photo festival, Perpignan, France

Bibliography

National Geographic cover stories

Skerry has six published photographs on the cover of National Geographic.

Books

Film, Television and video

Notes
a.
b.

References

External links
 
 National Geographic Photographers page

People from Uxbridge, Massachusetts
American photojournalists
American underwater divers
Underwater photographers
Artists from Massachusetts
Living people
Worcester State University alumni
1961 births
People from Milford, Massachusetts
National Geographic photographers